Dingle Dome may refer to:
 Dingle Dome (Antarctica)
 Turf Moor stadium